The regalia of Malaysia (Malay: Alat-alat Kebesaran Diraja Malaysia; Jawi: الت٢ كبسرن دراج مليسيا) includes all the items which are deemed sacred and symbolic of the supremacy and authority of the Yang di-Pertuan Agong or the Supreme King of Malaysia and his consort, the Raja Permaisuri Agong. The installation of the Supreme King is a very special ceremony. Only on this particular day are the masses able to see his regalia. Several of these are Malaysian National Treasures since 2009.

The Throne 

The Thrones at Istana Negara's Balairong Seri (Throne Room) is crafted to blend motifs from Peninsular Malaysia as well as Sabah and Sarawak.

The primary element is gold, to add regality and an imperial aura, and all designs point upwards to indicate that all beings are created by Allah.

Tengkolok Diraja (Royal headdress)
According to Malay legend, the first Sultan of Perak, Sultan Muzaffar Shah I Ibni Almarhum Sultan Mahmud Shah (1528–1549) set sail to Perak to establish the Perak Sultanate. Sultan Muzaffar was a descendant of the Malacca Sultanate, and was exiled to Johor by the Portuguese. He carried on his ship many of the regalia of Malacca, including the Royal Crown of Malacca.

During his journey, his ship entered shallow waters and was stuck. The only way to get the ship sailing again was by reducing the ship's load. One by one, the many items on board were cast into sea, but the ship refused to budge. Finally, the only object left was the Royal Crown of Malacca, which was then offered to the waters. The sea was happy with this, for immediately after the ship miraculously set sail on its own to Perak.

The Sultan took this as a sign, and swore that he and his descendants would never wear a crown during their installation. This practice came to be followed by other Malay Rulers. Thence, the Malay headdress known as the Tengkolok came to be the replacement for a crown.

For centuries, the Malay Rulers have worn headdresses as part of their regalia. These are made of embroidered silk folded in different styles since the days of the Malay Sultanate. The style of folding is called solek, and there are variations depending on the tradition of the royal family of a particular state. The colour of the headdress also varies from one state to another.

The royal headdress worn by the Yang di-Pertuan Agong during his installation is called the Tengkolok Diraja. Made of black fabric embroidered with gold thread, it is folded in the style called Dendam Tak Sudah ("Persistent Vengeance") from the state of Negeri Sembilan (which also inspired the elective monarchical system itself). Affixed to the front of Tengkolok Diraja is a bejewelled ornament of a crescent moon and the 14-pointed star called the Bintang Persekutuan (Federation Star). At the centre of the star is the Coat of arms of Malaysia.

Muskat

The royal attire of the Yang di-Pertuan Agong for the installation ceremony is the Muskat,King's Royal Dress. The origin of the Muskat can be traced to the ancient kingdom of Muscat, in present-day Oman. Originally, the Muskat was worn by government officials of Kedah.

The Muskat was first worn in 1960, at the installation of the third Yang di-Pertuan Agong, Almarhum Tuanku Syed Putra ibni Almarhum Syed Hassan Jamalullail. It was the introduced by Tunku Abdul Rahman Putra Al-haj, Malaysia's first prime minister, who was a prince of the Kedah royal house.

The Muskat is made of black wool embroidered with gold thread, in the pattern of the hibiscus, Malaysia's national flower. The dress is worn with headdress and embroidered long trousers at ceremonies to mark the King's installation, birthday, official visits to the states, and during the opening of Parliament. Past Hari Merdeka celebrations saw various other appearances of this dress.

Royal buckle

The Pending Diraja or Royal Buckle is made of pure gold and decorated with eleven rubies. The engraved centrepiece features the Malaysian arms. The belt is made of heavy ribbed silk, embroidered with floral motifs in gold thread.

Royal blades
The most revered item in the Malay royal regalia is the keris. Two the Keris Pendek Diraja and Keris Panjang Diraja among the Royal Regalia worn by the Yang di-Pertuan Agong.

Keris Pendek Diraja

Keris Pendek Diraja or Royal Short Keris is the short keris made from the steel blades of older keris. It has an ivory hilt and gold-decorated sheath. The hilt is called Hulu Pekaka and shaped like the head of the legendary Garuda bird. The Federation Crest is embossed on the crosspiece of the sheath. It can only be carried or worn by the reigning Yang di-Pertuan Agong.

Keris Panjang Diraja

The Keris Panjang Diraja is the most important symbol of authority during the installation ceremony. The Keris Panjang Diraja or Government Keris symbolises regal power and authority. Both its hilt and sheath are covered in gold. The crosspiece of the keris is engraved with the Emblem of Malaysia and that of the eleven states of Peninsular Malaysia.

The blade itself was forged from steel taken from eleven keris from each of the eleven states. The hilt of the keris is in the form of a horse's hoof with decorations resembling the jering (Archidendron pauciflorum) fruit. This keris is worn by the Yang di-Pertuan Agong only on certain occasions, and is kissed as a form of reverence during his installation.

Gendik Diraja (Royal tiara) 
The Gendik Diraja or Royal Tiara is worn by the Raja Permaisuri Agong during royal ceremonies and on the day of her husband's installation.

The Gendik is made of platinum and studded with diamonds. It is designed to come apart to form a locket and two brooches.

Kalung Diraja (Royal Necklace)

The Kalung Diraja or Royal Necklace is made of platinum and studded with diamonds. As with the Tiara, the Kalung can be separated into a pair of earrings, brooches, and kerabu (a traditional ornament for the ears).

Cogan (Sceptres)

Cogan Alam

The Cogan Alam ("Sceptre of the Universe") is part of the Royal Regalia. This silver ceremonial mace symbolises power and is 162.66 cm long. It consists of an orb mounted on a long shaft. The orb is topped by a crescent and an eleven-pointed gold star. Around the equator of the orb, the crests of the eleven Peninsular Malaysian states are embossed in gold. The orb is supported by four tigers while the shaft itself is decorated with six padi stalks in gold.

Cogan Agama

The 155.04 cm long Cogan Agama ("Sceptre of Religion") is also made of silver. It consists of a large, conical-shaped head with a golden, five-pointed star mounted on a long shaft. Quranic verses are embossed on the head and shaft.

Mace

The Cokmar, or War Clubs, or Mace are another symbol of power and part of the panoply of authority of the Malaysian Government. The pair of Cokmar are made of silver. Each is 81.32 cm long and consists of a circular, fluted orb made of plain silver and mounted on a short shaft, also made of silver.

Other regalia

Other components of the Royal Regalia are the Pedang Diraja (Royal Swords), Keris Panjang Diraja (Long Keris) and Sundang Diraja (Royal Sword-Keris). The Keris, Pedang and Sundang are traditional Malay weapons that have become symbols of royalty. These have silver-gilt hilts and sheaths.

The Payung Ubur-Ubur Kuning (Yellow Umbrellas) are 20 in number, and made of silver. Yellow symbolises royalty and is reserved for royal personages. The Royal Yellow Umbrellas are each tipped a finial of an eleven-pointed star and crescent.

The Tombak Berambu (Long Spears) are also 20 in number, and have blades with three, curved indentations. They are made from ancient spears given by the eleven states of Peninsular Malaysia.

Nobat 
The Nobat or Royal Musical Ensemble is a form of traditional Malay music and is considered part of the Royal Regalia. The Nobat only plays on special occasions like the Installation of the Yang di-Pertuan Agong, the investitures of the other Malay Rulers, and the Agong's birthday, and other royal ceremonies including weddings, births and funerals. The ensemble originated in the 15th century.

The term originates from the Persian word naubat, which means nine types of instruments. Currently, only Terengganu, Kelantan, Kedah, Perak and Selangor maintain Nobat ensembles, with the instrumentation differing by state. The Kedah and Perak ensembles are the oldest in the federation, while those of Terengganu and Selangor use loaned sets (the former from the Riau-Lingga Sultanate, last used there in 1910, and the latter a complete set from Perak given when the state's first ruler was enthroned). Kelantan's ensemble, reformed in 2016, is the youngest (existing since the early 20th century). It is termed Pasukan Gendang Besar Diraja only in that state, unlike the four others which are titled nobat.

A typical arrangement has five instruments:
Gendang Negara ("state" kettledrum) 
Gendang Ibu ("mother" drum, double-headed)
Gendang Anak ("child" drum, double-headed and slightly smaller than the Gendang Ibu)
 Serunai (oboes or clarinets), one to two in number
Nafiri (trumpet) 

The ensembles of Perak and Selangor have the same instrumentation, while the Kedah Nobat includes a wooden rod covered with yellow cloth (Mahaguru) and a medium-sized, mounted gong. The Terengganu ensemble possesses a set of clash cymbals. Kelantan's has an additional serunai plus two rebab lutes, two large gongs, and two more Gendang Anak.

During the installation of the Yang Di-Pertuan Agong, the Nobat orchestra will play the tune Raja Berangkat (The King Arrives / Departs) as he and his consort enters the Balairong Seri. When the installation regalia are brought in, the ensemble will play the tune Menjunjung Duli. The climax of the ceremony is when the Yang Di-Pertuan Agong reads the Installation Oath, after which the tune Raja Bertabal (The King is Installed) is heard. These three tunes have their own names in their home states. For example, in Kedah, they are known as: Belayar (Sailing), Palu [(The Drums are) Beaten] and Perang (War) respectively - while in Terengganu, the songs are played to the melody of Iskandar Shah (King Alexander), Palu-Palu Melayu [(The) Malay (drums are) Beaten] and Ibrahim Khalil [Abraham, friend (of God)].

Each state with the nobat has their own repertoire of tunes. The Kedah ensemble has 19 surviving pieces (more than in the other ensembles), while Perak and Selangor share the same 16 songs, 13 in the Terengganu nobat and 8 songs in Kelantan's. The leader and conductor of a Nobat ensemble is responsible for the musicians under him, and for the care and maintenance of the instruments. The positions of the musicians are hereditary by custom; the Perak and Selangor musicians are hired from the same clan known as Orang Kalur. Although the Kedah musicians are also known as Orang Kalur, it is not currently known how, or whether or not they are related. One of the taboos in these 3 ensembles is that those who are not from the Orang Kalur clan are forbidden to play or even touch these instruments, for they are considered sacred. This is also attributed to the belief that the instruments are home to guardian spirits (penunggu). The nobat has a significant relationship to the Sultan's daulat (sovereignty, inner aura or spirit); the greater his daulat, the grander and more haunting the sounds produced will be.

While the ensembles of Selangor, Terengganu, and Kelantan play only at official occasions, the Kedah ensemble plays every day before prayer hours and during holidays and celebrations. In Perak, the nobat is also sounded during days of Islamic significance: the last 3 afternoons before and final 6 nights of Ramadhan, the eve of Eid-ul-Fitr, 3 consecutive afternoons before Eid-ul-Adha, and the mornings of those two days, including the arrival and departure of the Sultan of Perak at the Ubudiah Mosque to perform the congregational Eid prayers.

References

 Special regalia for King’s installation, The Star, 25 April 2007.
 Special meaning for nobat ensemble, The Star, 24 April 2007.

Literature

External links
 Yang di-Pertuan Agong (Malaysian Monarchy)

Malaysia
Malaysia
Malaysian monarchy